Horribilis Peak is a  mountain summit located in the Coast Mountains of the Pacific Ranges in British Columbia, Canada. Its nearest higher peak is Utan Peak,  to the northwest. The peak was named in 1964 by a George Whitemore mountaineering party in recognition of the grizzly bears upon whose territory the mountaineers were trespassing. The mountain's name was officially adopted April 15, 1984, by the Geographical Names Board of Canada. Precipitation runoff from the mountain drains into Ape Creek which is a tributary of the Talchako River.


Climate
Based on the Köppen climate classification, Horribilis Peak is located in the marine west coast climate zone of western North America. Most weather fronts originate in the Pacific Ocean, and travel east toward the Coast Mountains where they are forced upward by the range (Orographic lift), causing them to drop their moisture in the form of rain or snowfall. As a result, the Coast Mountains experience high precipitation, especially during the winter months in the form of snowfall. Winter temperatures can drop below −20 °C with wind chill factors below −30 °C.

See also
Geography of British Columbia

References

External links
 Weather: Horribilis Peak

Two-thousanders of British Columbia
Pacific Ranges
Range 3 Coast Land District